Bukseong-dong is neighbourhood of Jung District, Incheon, South Korea.

History 
An area known as Bukseongpo because of fishing boats since ancient times has been named Bukseong-dong when the name was revised in 1946. It was called Hwabangjeong during the Japanese colonial period, and it was derived from the name of the first Japanese ambassador to Korea Hanabusa Yoshitada, who played a leading role in opening Incheon.

Seonlin-dong belongs to the smallest dong of the courtrooms, which are known as the boundary of Cheongguk, aka Cheonggwan area. Japanese people called Ginajeong (미) or Misengjeong (彌 生 町). In May 1977, the districts of Beopseong-dong and Seonlin-dong in Beopjeong-dong were designated as administrative districts of Bukseong-dong, and are operating.

Tourist attractions
Jajangmyeon Museum is a museum about Jajangmyeon noodle.

References

Jung District, Incheon
Neighbourhoods in Incheon